Mette Schjoldager (born 21 April 1977) is a Danish badminton player from Viby, Roskilde Municipality, on the island of Zealand.

Career
Schjoldager made her debut at the Olympic Games in 2000 Sydney. Teamed-up with Ann-Lou Jørgensen, they beat Elena Nozdran/Viktoriya Evtushenko of Ukraine in the first round, but was defeated in the second round by Indonesian pair Etty Tantri/Cynthia Tuwankotta. In the mixed doubles, she partnered with Jens Eriksen. The duo had a bye in the first round, beat Michael Keck/Nicol Pitro of German, and were defeated bye Tri Kusharjanto/Minarti Timur of Indonesia in the quarterfinals.

Schjoldager again competed in badminton at the 2004 Summer Olympics in women's doubles with partner Pernille Harder.  They had a bye in the first round and were defeated by Ra Kyung-min and Lee Kyung-won of Korea in the round of 16. In the mixed doubles with partner Jens Eriksen, they defeated Svetoslav Stoyanov /Victoria Wright of France in the first round and Kim Yong-hyun/Lee Hyo-jung of South Korea in the second. In the quarterfinals, Schjoldager and Eriksen beat Nova Widianto/Vita Marissa of Indonesia 15-12, 15-8 to advance to the semifinals. There, they lost to Zhang Jun/Gao Ling of China 15–9, 15–5.  In the bronze medal match, they defeated fellow Danish pair Jonas Rasmussen/Rikke Olsen 15–5, 15–5 to win the bronze medal.

Achievements

Olympic Games 
Mixed doubles

World Championships 
Mixed doubles

World Cup 
Mixed doubles

European Championships 
Women's doubles

Mixed doubles

European Junior Championships 
Girls' doubles

IBF World Grand Prix 
The World Badminton Grand Prix sanctioned by International Badminton Federation (IBF) since 1983.

Women's doubles

Mixed doubles

IBF International 
Women's doubles

Mixed doubles

Record against selected opponents 
Mixed doubles results with Jens Eriksen against Super Series finalists, world Semi-finalists, and Olympic quarterfinalists:

  Chen Qiqiu & Zhao Tingting 4–1
  Zhang Jun & Gao Ling 1–9
  Xie Zhongbo & Zhang Yawen 1–2
  Thomas Laybourn & Kamilla Rytter Juhl 0–2
  Simon Archer & Joanne Goode 1–1
  Nathan Robertson & Gail Emms 2–1
  Nova Widianto & Liliyana Natsir 1–0
  Kim Dong-moon & Ra Kyung-min 0–3
  Robert Mateusiak & Nadieżda Zięba 1–0
  Sudket Prapakamol & Saralee Thungthongkam 0–3

References

External links 
 
 

1977 births
Living people
People from Roskilde Municipality
Danish female badminton players
Badminton players at the 2000 Summer Olympics
Badminton players at the 2004 Summer Olympics
Olympic badminton players of Denmark
Olympic bronze medalists for Denmark
Olympic medalists in badminton
Medalists at the 2004 Summer Olympics
Sportspeople from Region Zealand